(The) Grey Lady or (The) Gray Lady may refer to:

Films
The Grey Lady (film), 1937 German film also known as Sherlock Holmes: The Grey Lady
Grey Lady (film), 2017 American film directed by John Shea

Folklore
Grey Lady, a ghost reputed to haunt Rufford Old Hall, Lancashire, England
Grey Lady, a ghost reputed to haunt Theatre Royal, Bath, England
Grey Lady, a ghost reputed to haunt Fort St. Angelo, Birgu, Malta
The Grey Lady, a spirit reputed to haunt Cumberland College, in Dunedin, New Zealand
The Gray Lady Ghost, reputed to haunt the old parsonage in Sims, North Dakota, United States 
The Grey Lady, a ghost reputed to haunt the Dark Hedges, County Antrim, Northern Ireland
The Grey Lady, a ghost reputed to haunt Gainsborough Old Hall, Lincolnshire, England

Entertainment
The Gray Lady, a spirit from Ghostbusters
The Grey Lady, a character in The Good Witch
The Grey Lady, a character in Harry Potter; see Hogwarts staff

Other uses
, American catamaran ferry
A member of the Gray Ladies, volunteers working with the American Red Cross in WWII
The Gray Lady, a nickname for The New York Times

See also
The Old Grey Lady, a nickname for Legion Field in Birmingham, Alabama, US
The Little Grey Lady of the Sea, a nickname for Nantucket Island, Massachusetts, US